The Best WNBA Player ESPY Award  is an award given at the ESPY Awards show.  It has been presented annually since 1998 to the Women's National Basketball Association (WNBA) player who has been voted the best in the preceding year before the ceremony.  Beginning in 2003, the winner has been chosen by online voting, before that, determination of the winners was made by an panel of experts.

The inaugural winner was Cynthia Cooper, who would go on to win three consecutive awards. Candace Parker has won the award a record four times, while Lauren Jackson, Lisa Leslie and Diana Taurasi have won the award three times. Only Cooper and Taurasi had their three wins in consecutive years.  All winners other than Jackson, who is Australian, have been American.  Winners have played all five of the standard Basketball positions, the most honored position is power forward, players playing power forward have won eight awards. The award wasn't awarded in 2020 due to the COVID-19 pandemic.

List of winners
 Player was a member of the winning team in the WNBA Finals  Player was a member of the losing team in the WNBA Finals † WNBA Finals MVP

See also

 List of sports awards honoring women
Women's National Basketball Association awards
Women's National Basketball Association Most Valuable Player Award
Best NBA Player ESPY Award

References

Awards established in 1998
Lists of Women's National Basketball Association players
ESPY Awards
Women's National Basketball Association awards